The Cryptobranchidae are a family of fully aquatic salamanders commonly known as the giant salamanders. They include the largest living amphibians. The family is native to China, Japan, and the eastern United States. They constitute one of two living families within the Cryptobranchoidea, one of two main divisions of living salamanders, the other being the Asiatic salamanders belonging to the family Hynobiidae.

The largest species are in the genus Andrias, native to east Asia.

The hellbender (Cryptobranchus alleganiensis) inhabits the eastern United States and is the only member of the genus Cryptobranchus.

Taxonomy
The family name is from the Ancient Greek krypto ("hidden"), and branch ("gill"), which refer to how the members absorb oxygen through capillaries of their side-frills, which function as gills.

Clade Pancryptobrancha (Cryptobranchidae + Ukrainurus)
 Genus †Ukrainurus Ukraine, Miocene
 †Ukrainurus hypsognathus
 Genus †Chunerpeton? China, Middle Jurassic
 †Chunerpeton tianyiensis
Family Cryptobranchidae
 Genus Cryptobranchus (hellbenders)
 †Cryptobranchus saskatchewanensis? Ravenscrag Formation, Canada, Paleocene
 Cryptobranchus alleganiensis (hellbender)
 Genus Andrias (Asian giant salamanders; sometimes classified among the Cryptobranchus)
Andrias davidianus (Chinese giant salamander) – (may actually be a species complex of 5 different species)
Andrias sligoi (South China giant salamander)
Andrias japonicus (Japanese giant salamander) –
Andrias jiangxiensis (Jiangxi giant salamander)
 †Andrias matthewi North America, Miocene
 †Andrias scheuchzeri Europe, Oligocene-Pliocene
 Genus †Eoscapherpeton Central Asia, Late Cretaceous (Cenomanian-Campanian)
Genus †Aviturus Mongolia, Paleocene
 †Aviturus exsecratus
 Genus †Ulanurus Mongolia, Paleocene
 †Ulanurus fractus
 Genus †Zaissanurus Kazakhstan, Oligocene
 †Zaissanurus beliajevae

Fossil record

Extant species in the family Cryptobranchidae are the modern-day members of a lineage that extends back tens millions of years. The oldest known fossils of cryptobranchoids are known from the Middle Jurassic of China. Chunerpeton from the Middle Jurassic of China has been suggested to represent the oldest known cryptobranchid. However, some studies have found it to be a more basal cryptobranchoid not more closely related to Cryptobranchidae than to Hynobiidae. The next oldest cryptobranchid is Eoscapherpeton, known from numerous Late Cretaceous deposits in Central Asia, which is suggested to represent a stem-group to modern cryptobranchids. Modern crown group representatives appear during the Paleocene.

As the fossil record for the Cryptobranchidae shows an Asian origin for the family, how these salamanders made it to the eastern US has been a point of scientific interest. Research has indicated a dispersal via land bridge, with waves of adaptive radiation seeming to have swept the Americas from north to south.

In 1726, the Swiss physician Johann Jakob Scheuchzer described a fossil as Homo diluvii testis (Latin: Evidence of a diluvian human), believing it to be the remains of a human being who drowned in the biblical flood. The Teylers Museum in Haarlem, Netherlands, bought the fossil in 1802, where it is still exhibited. In 1812, the fossil was examined by Georges Cuvier, who recognized that it was not human. After being identified as a salamander, it was renamed Salamandra scheuchzeri by Holl in 1831. The genus Andrias was coined six years later by Tschudi. In doing so, both the genus, Andrias (which means "image of man"), and the specific name, scheuchzeri, ended up honouring Scheuchzer and his beliefs. It and the extant A. davidianus cannot be mutually distinguished, and the latter, only described in 1871, is therefore sometimes considered a synonym of the former.

Description
Cryptobranchids are large salamanders, with large folds of skin along their flanks. These help increase the animals' surface area, allowing them to absorb more oxygen from the water. They have four toes on the fore limbs, and five on the hind limbs. They have paedomorphic traits, meaning their metamorphosis from the larval stage is incomplete, so the adults retain gill slits (although they also have lungs), and lack eyelids. They have a stout body with a heavy, laterally compressed tail. They have bad eyesight.

Cryptobranchids are animals with a backbone, that have moist, smooth skin. They are also a cold-blooded animal which means their temperature is the same as the temperature of their surroundings.

Distribution and habitat
In Japan, their natural habitats are threatened by dam-building.  Ramps and staircases have been added to some dams to allow them to move upstream to areas where they spawn.

Behavior
A Japanese giant salamander lived for 52 years in captivity.

Feeding
The Chinese giant salamander eats aquatic insects, fish, frogs, crabs, and shrimp. They hunt mainly at night.  As they have poor eyesight, they use sensory nodes on their heads and bodies to detect minute changes in water pressure, enabling them to find their prey.

Reproduction
During mating season, the salamanders travel upstream, where the female lays two strings of over 200 eggs each. Lacking the stereotypical courtship behaviors found in other species, the male fertilizes the eggs externally by releasing his sperm onto them, and then guards them for at least three months, until they hatch. Tail fanning also occurs in order to increase the oxygen supply for the eggs. At this point, the larvae live off their noticeable stored fat until ready to hunt. Once ready, they hunt as a group rather than individually.

Scientists at Hiroshima City Asa Zoological Park in Japan have recently discovered the male salamander will spawn with more than one female in his den. Only large males can occupy and guard a den. They guard the den against other males and sexually inactive females. Those that are sexually active are welcomed. On occasion, the male "den master" will also allow a second male (smaller male salamanders, named "satellite males", who do not have their own den) into the den; the reason for this is unclear.

References

External links

BBC article with video on Giant salamanders from Japan
Cryptobranchid Interest Group
 Tree of Life: Cryptobranchidae
Chinese Giant Salamander
Japanese Giant Salamander

Cryptobranchoidea
 
Extant Middle Jurassic first appearances
Taxa named by Leopold Fitzinger